Mohammed Salim (1904 – 5 November 1980) was an Indian footballer from Calcutta (now Kolkata, West Bengal), which at the time was part of the British Raj. Salim was best known for his role in the fabled 1930s Mohammedan SC team which claimed five successive Calcutta Football League titles. He also became the first player from the Indian sub-continent to play for a European club, Celtic FC.

Early life
Salim was a chemist and a pharmacist from Bengal, born in Metiaburuz, a lower-middle-class locality in Calcutta in 1904. Uninterested in formal academic training, he displayed great footballing skill from childhood. Mohun Bagan's IFA Shield triumph in 1911 also contributed to drawing the young Salim to football.

Career

Early career
Indian nationalists were fighting for independence from British colonial rule during the 1920s and 1930s. Many Indians took to football to answer British jibes that Indians were incapable of home rule. They played in bare feet and managed to defeat British teams wearing boots which was seen as evidence that Indians were in no way inferior. Salim did not find it difficult to join the Chittaranjan Club of Bowbazar, Central Calcutta. Managed by a group of educated Bengali middle-class patrons, they instilled in Salim the fervent desire to beat the European in his game. Salim then had a short stint in the B team of Mohammedan Sporting Club. Struck by Salim's exceptional talent, Pankaj Gupta, Bengal's legendary sports administrator, recruited Salim to play for his club Sporting Union. He went on to spend a season with East Bengal Club before moving to the Aryans Club under the auspices of Choney Majumdar, a leading sportsman of contemporary Bengal.

Mohammedan SC and Celtic FC
Salim rejoined Mohammedan Sporting Club in 1934 and was finally part of their first team setup. Salim was instrumental in helping the Club to five league titles in a row:

After the title win of 1936, Salim was invited to play in two exhibition matches against the Chinese Olympic side. The first would be an All India XI and the second would be a select civil and military side. These games were the first international matches played in India, organised by the provincial IFA, but it was not until the following year that the India national team began in earnest with the founding of the AIFF. The first match between the Indian and Chinese sides was a draw with Noor Mohammed scoring for the Indian team. After the first game, Salim was praised by the Chinese official Dr Chi Chao Yung:

Before the second match took place, Salim had disappeared. The police were solicited to search for him and advertisements were inserted in newspapers requesting that he join the Civil and Military XI immediately. These efforts were in vain as Salim was en route to Britain via Cairo. A relative called Hasheem who lived in England was visiting Calcutta and witnessed the first match. Having seen Salim's exceptional display, Hasheem had persuaded him to try his hand at European football.

After a few days in London, Hasheem took him to Celtic Park in Glasgow, Scotland. Salim was surprised to note that all the Celtic players were professionals but he was confident that he could compete with them. Hasheem spoke to Willie Maley, the Celtic manager, "A great player from India has come by ship. Will you please take a trial of his? But there is a slight problem. Salim plays in bare feet."

The idea of a bare-footed amateur from India competing against Scottish professionals was difficult for Maley to believe but he agreed to give him a trial. Salim was asked to demonstrate his skill before 1,000 club members and three registered coaches. Salim's ability, even in bare feet, astonished them. They decided to play him in two upcoming Alliance matches. As both of these games were friendlies, he is not recorded to have played.

Salim made his debut in a 5–1 victory against Hamilton Accies, where "he took a penalty and scored with a great shot." He thus became the first player from the Indian sub-continent to play for a European club.

On 28 August 1936, he helped Celtic win 7–1 against Galston. The Scottish Daily Express carried the headline "Indian Juggler – New Style" along with a magical description of Salim:

The following is an excerpt from the Glasgow Observer:

Alan Breck's Book of Scottish Football also recorded Salim playing for Celtic:

Salim soon became homesick and was determined to return to India. Celtic pleaded with him to remain in Scotland for a season, even offering to organise a charity match on his behalf and promising him five percent of the total gate proceeds. Salim refused and asked that the money (£1,800; a large amount of money at the time) be donated to local orphans who were also to be invited to the match. Salim was also offered a professional contract to play in Germany. In the end, he travelled back to India to rejoin Mohammedan Sporting Club in time for the beginning of the 1937 Calcutta Football League.

Legacy
When Salim fell ill due to old age, his second son Rashid Ahmed wrote a letter to Celtic about his illness and stated that he needed money for his treatment:

Following Salim's death in 1980, an obituary message in the Amrita Bazar Patrika announced:

In colonial India, challenging British superiority was the most difficult task of all. Salim had achieved this seemingly impossible task through his football. He demonstrated that bare-footed Indians could match the British. In a nation plagued by religious violence, and political and economic uncertainties he helped reassure Indians that the might of the colonial state could be successfully subverted on the sporting field.

Honours
Mohammedan Sporting Club
Calcutta Football League: 1934, 1935, 1936, 1937, 1938
IFA Shield: 1936

Individual
Dr. Bidhan Chandra Roy State Award: 1976

See also
List of Indian football players in foreign leagues

Notes

ബൂട്ടിടാത്ത ആ ഇന്ത്യക്കാരനെ യൂറോപ്യൻ ക്ലബ് ഇന്നും ഓർക്കുന്നുണ്ട്'; ഇന്ത്യ മറന്ന മുഹമ്മദ് സലീമിന്റെ കഥ

Further reading
 affiliationregisteredcelticsupporters.org (2012). CELTIC'S BAREFOOTED JUGGLER. Available: http://www.affiliationregisteredcelticsupporters.org/articles/2012/08/celtic%E2%80%99s-barefooted-juggler/. Last accessed 17 April 2013.
 Bose, M. (2003). A unique import thrilled Celtic fans back in the 1930s. Available: https://www.telegraph.co.uk/sport/2404435/A-unique-import-thrilled-Celtic-fans-back-in-the-1930s.html. Last accessed 17 April 2013.
 Breck, A. (1937). Alan Breck's Book of Scottish Football. Glasgow: Scottish Daily Express.
 Burrowes, J. (2011). Great Glasgow Stories. Edinburgh: Mainstream Publishing/Random House. 40. .
 Carrington, P. and Mcdonald, I. (2001). 'Race', Sport and British Society. London: Routledge. 38–39. .
 Dart, J. (2005). Deliberately subbing goalkeepers for penalties Plus: Celtic's Indian who only played in bandages, goalscoring goalkeepers, the most European Cup campaigns without winning and unmasking Nicole Wright. Available: http://www.guardian.co.uk/football/2005/apr/27/theknowledge.sport. Last accessed 17 April 2013.
 indianfootball.de (2009). MOHAMMED SALIM. Available: http://www.indianfootball.de/data/halloffame/salim_mohammed.html. Last accessed 17 April 2013.
 MacBride E., O’Connor M. and Sheridan G. (1994). An Alphabet of the Celts: A Who's Who of Celtic FC. Leicestershire: ACL and Polar Publishing. .
 Majumdar, B. and Bandyopadhyay, K. (2006). A Social History Of Indian Football: Striving To Score. London: Routledge. 68–78. .
 Majumdar B. and Bandyopadhyay K. (2006). Goalless: the Story of a Unique Footballing Nation. New Delhi: Penguin Books. .
 mdsportingclub.webs.com (2007). Titles. Available: http://mdsportingclub.webs.com/titles.htm. Last accessed 17 April 2013.
 mdsportingclub.webs.com (2007). Legends. Available: http://mdsportingclub.webs.com/legends.htm. Last accessed 17 April 2013.
 Mitra, A. (2008). A GAME TO REMEMBER – A thundering success was lost in the poisoned atmosphere. Available: . Last accessed 17 April 2013.
 Mubarak, H. (2005). Asian Players in Europe 1900–1960. Available: http://www.rsssf.com/players/as-players-in-eur.html. Last accessed 17 April 2013.
 Naha, S. (2012). SALIM: INDIAN FOOTBALL’S UNSUNG LEGEND. Available: http://www.barefootmag.in/2012/03/26/salim-indian-footballs-unsung-legend/. Last accessed 17 April 2013.
 Nandita, J. (2012). Mohammed Salim: The first Indian to play for a European Club. Available: http://www.goal.com/en-india/news/2292/editorials/2012/07/05/3222828/mohammed-salim-the-first-indian-to-play-for-a-european-club. Last accessed 17 April 2013.
 Sen, D. and Varshney, D. (co-producers) (2008–2009). Indian Football (Television production). India: ZEE Sports/Ten Sports. "YouTube title: Indian Football – Part 1/7".
 Shahabuddin, K.S. (2012). Chapter 7. Summer Holidays and Football in Calcutta. Available: http://sayeedsjournal.wordpress.com/chapter-7-summer-holidays-and-football-in-calcutta/. Last accessed 17 April 2013.
 sport.scotsman.com (2008). Barefooted Indian who left Calcutta to join Celtic. Available: http://www.scotsman.com/sport/barefooted_indian_who_left_calcutta_to_join_celtic_1_1151472. Last accessed 17 April 2013.
 the-ifa.org (2010). Football in Bengal. Available: https://web.archive.org/web/20111203053022/http://the-ifa.org/archives.php. Last accessed 17 April 2013.
 Vasili, P. (2000). Colouring Over the White Line: The History of Black Footballers in Britain. Edinburgh: Mainstream Publishing/Random House. 64. .

 

Footballers from Kolkata
Indian footballers
Indian expatriate footballers
Celtic F.C. players
1904 births
1980 deaths
Expatriate footballers in Scotland
Association football wingers
20th-century Bengalis
Indian expatriate sportspeople in Scotland
Mohammedan SC (Kolkata) players
East Bengal Club players
Aryan FC players